Voice of America is the second solo studio album by Little Steven & the Disciples of Soul released on May 7, 1984, four weeks before Bruce Springsteen released Born in the U.S.A.

This album traded in the horns and the R&B influences of the previous Men Without Women for a raw, garage rock sound. Politics came to the lyrical forefront, with the general theme being opposition to the Reagan Era's American foreign policy.

"Out of the Darkness", a synthesizer-led anthem with sweeping arena rock and hair metal atmosphere, garnered some airplay, as well as music video play on MTV, and was effective in concert, while the somewhat softer and evocative "Checkpoint Charlie" also received considerable radio airplay.  "Los Desaparecidos" gained praise as an effective protest song on behalf of the 1970s and 1980s victims of state-sponsored forced disappearance in South America. On other songs, the political viewpointing became more strident and was criticized as somewhat artless.

"I Am a Patriot", which held roughly that dissent was not disloyalty, became a favorite song of Jackson Browne, who covered it on his 1989 album World in Motion, and who frequently performed it in his concerts. In 2004, the two would duet on the song during the last of the Vote for Change shows. Pearl Jam has covered the song as well.

In 2019, the album was remastered for release as part of Van Zandt's career-spanning box set Rock N Roll Rebel: The Early Work. The digital deluxe edition of the album was released on October 25, 2019, containing 10 bonus tracks, including the studio outtake "Rock N Roll Rebel", which was written following Van Zandt and Bruce Springsteen's 1983 removal from Disneyland due to their clothing being deemed inappropriate. The digital deluxe edition also includes the reissued Vote! bonus EP.

Track listing

Personnel

Little Steven and the Disciples of Soul
 Little Steven – lead vocals, guitar, arrangements
 Jean Beauvoir – bass, vocals
 Dino Danelli – drums
 Monti Louis Ellison – congas, African talking drum, shekere, wind chimes, tambourine, timbales, backing vocals
 Pee Wee Weber – keyboards, backing vocals
 Zoë Yanakis – oboe, backing vocals, additional keyboards
Additional musicians
 Gary U.S. Bonds – backing vocals ("Among the Believers")
Technical
 Little Steven – producer, package design
 John Rollo – engineer, production assistance 
 Leif Mases – engineer 
 Jean Trenchant – engineer 
 Bob Clearmountain – mixing 
 Zoë Yanakis – production assistance, assistant engineer 
 Peter Hefter – assistant engineer 
 Malcolm Pollack – additional engineer, assistant mixing engineer
 Peter Millius – additional assistant engineer 
 John Davenport – additional assistant engineer
 Mikael Hogstrand – additional assistant engineer 
 Dave Greenberg – additional assistant engineer
 Bruce Lampcov – additional assistant engineer
 Wally Traugott – mastering
 Henry Marquez – art direction
 Dino Danelli – package design, song titles design
 Jim Marchese – photography
 Mark Weiss – photography
 CLE Print – reprographics

Bonus tracks
"Vote!"
 Little Steven – lead guitar, producer, arrangement
 Darlene Love – backing vocals 
 Jean Beauvoir – co-producer 
 Zoë Yanakis – engineer
 Steven Escallier – engineer 
 Paul Ray – engineer 
 Dominic Maita – engineer 
 Steven Thompson – mixing
 Mike Barbiero – mixing
 Greg Calbi – mastering
 Recorded at Pantheon Studios (Arizona), Sunset Sound (Los Angeles), RPM Studios (New York City)

"Caravan", "I Don't Want to Go Home" 
 Little Steven – vocals, guitar
 Jean Beauvoir - bas
 Benjamin King - keyboards
 Dino Danelli - drums
 Richie "LaBamba" Rosenberg - trombone
 Crispin Cioe - baritone saxophone
 Arno Hecht - tenor saxophone, flute
 Paul Litteral - trumpet
 Nelson Bogart - trumpet
 Monti Louis Ellison - percussion
 Zoë Yanakis - oboe

"Inside of Me"
 Little Steven – vocals, piano

Charts
Album

Singles

"Vote!" was also released as a single but did not chart.

References

1983 albums
Steven Van Zandt albums
Albums produced by Steven Van Zandt
EMI America Records albums
Albums recorded at Polar Studios
Reagan Era